WHUR-FM (96.3 MHz) is an urban adult contemporary radio station that is licensed to Washington, D.C., and serving the Metro D.C. area.  It is owned and operated by Howard University, making it one of the few commercial radio stations in the United States to be owned by a college or university, as well as being the only independent, locally-owned station in the Washington, D.C., area. Also, the staff of the station mentors the students of the university's school of communications. The studios are located on campus in its Lower Quad portion, and the transmitter tower is based in the Tenleytown neighborhood.  It is also co-owned with its television partner, WHUT-TV, one of D.C.'s PBS affiliates.

WHUR is also the home of the original Quiet Storm program, which longtime D.C. listeners have rated number one in the evening since 1976, and which spawned the namesake music genre that now airs on many radio stations across the United States. Jeff Brown hosts The Original Quiet Storm weeknights beginning at 7:30 p.m. In 2005, it also began broadcasting in IBOC digital radio, using the HD Radio system from iBiquity.

History 

The station began operations in August 1939 as experimental FM station W3XO, on 43.2 MHz in the original FM band. It was founded by Jansky & Bailey, a local Washington firm headed by consulting radio engineers C. M. Jansky and Stuart Bailey. In October 1945 W3XO was sold to WINX Broadcasting Company for $75,000. This company also operated WINX (1340 AM), and was owned by the Washington Post newspaper.

In May 1940, the Federal Communications Commission (FCC) had announced the establishment, effective January 1, 1941, of an FM band operating on 40 channels spanning 42–50 MHz. However, as of 1945 there were no commercial FM stations in the Washington area, with the only local FM broadcasters consisting of two experimental authorizations: W3XO, plus Everett L. Dillard's W3XL. In November 1945, the WINX Broadcasting Company filed an application to convert W3XO into the Washington-area's first commercial station. The application was granted the following August, and assigned the call letters WINX-FM.

WINX-FM started regular broadcasting in September 1946, with a daily schedule from 9:00 a.m. to 11:15 p.m., mostly duplicating the programming of WINX. The FCC was in the process of reassigning the original FM band frequencies to other services, and ordered existing stations to move to a new band from 88 to 106 MHz, which was later expanded to 88–108 MHz. During a transition period from the original FM "low band" to the new "high band", some stations broadcast simultaneously on their old and new frequencies. Thus, initially WINX-FM transmitted on both 43.2 and 92.9 MHz. In July 1946 the FCC directed that FM stations currently operating on 42-44 MHz would have to move to new frequencies by the end of the year, and the station received a temporary authorization to transmit on 44.7 MHz. In 1947, WINX-FM was reassigned to 96.3 MHz.

WINX-FM had the slogan "Sounds like Washington", to reflect the station's local ownership, which is still in use today. In 1949, the Post sold the AM station, WINX, and purchased WTOP (1500 AM). At this point WINX-FM's call letters were changed to WTOP-FM.

In 1971 the Post donated WTOP-FM to Howard University, in order to "stimulate the intellectual and cultural life of the whole community and to train more people for the communications industry". On December 6, 1971, the station changed its call letters to WHUR-FM. WHUR became a jazz-formatted radio station, which it remained until the 1990s, when it switched to an urban adult contemporary format.

In 1977, WHUR-FM reporter and student intern Maurice Williams was killed during the Hanafi Siege in Washington, D.C.

By 1995, WHUR became one of the highest-rated radio stations in the market, right behind WPGC-FM. Also that year, WHUR became the Washington radio and flagship affiliate of the syndicated Tom Joyner Morning Show (TJMS). However, in 1999, ABC Radio Networks did not renew its contract with WHUR and moved the show to WMMJ, thus ending its four-year relationship with the station. WHUR was forced to produce its own locally-based morning drive show. This initially affected the station's dominance over rival WMMJ. WHUR, in 2002, acquired The Michael Baisden Show and later, in 2005, The Steve Harvey Morning Show. The station regained its top two spots in the market to date, pacing number two in the 12+ demographic and number one in the 25–54 demographic and the number one urban formatted station in D.C.  In 2013, The Michael Baisden Show was cancelled due to its distributor, Cumulus Media and Baisden failing to reach an agreement; WHUR has since replaced its P.M. drive with former Baltimore and Atlanta radio personality Frank Ski, former host of the morning show on WVEE in Atlanta (where Ski still resides).

The quiet storm format of mellow, rhythm and blues and soul music, smooth jazz and love songs often played at night on many radio stations started at WHUR. The format originated when then intern Melvin Lindsey played a soothing string of songs during a particularly bad storm in the mid-1970s, even as power was cut to most of the other radio stations in the Washington, D.C., area. The quiet storm nighttime format has since been replicated in other major cities that have R&B station formats, such as San Francisco-based KBLX (which formerly utilized a 24-hour quiet storm format for three decades).

Bob "Nighthawk" Terry (real name:  Bobby Joe Horn), a former WHUR personality, disappeared in August 1977 under mysterious circumstances.

In September 2016, the station was awarded "Urban Station of The Year" by the National Association of Broadcasters'.

HD and satellite radio 
WHUR-FM produces several ancillary programming streams, variously available over its HD Radio signal and SiriusXM satellite radio:
 WHUR-FMHD2 is "The Quiet Storm Station", a 24-hour music stream modeled after WHUR's longtime evening program.
 WHUR-FMHD3, branded as "WHBC 96.3", is a student-run mainstream urban format focused on hit-driven hip hop, soul and R&B titles.
 WHUR-FMHD4 is "DC Radio", a city-run community station with local music and community affairs.
 "HUR Voices" is an urban talk channel hosted on SiriusXM.
 "HBCU RadioNet" is a second SiriusXM channel hosting talk and music programming produced by Howard and other historically black colleges and universities.

Translator
WHUR-HD2 is simulcast in analog on an independently-owned translator.

See also
Patrick Ellis
List of journalists killed in the United States

References

External links
WHUR official website
FCC History Cards for WHUR-FM (covering 1945-1978)
WHBC (WHUR-FM HD3)
H.U.R. Voices
HBCU RadioNet
Glasshouse Radio

 March 28, 2005 Michael Baisden replaced Doug Gilmore & Lorna Newton, "Live" with Doug & Lorna on WHUR weekday afternoons Scroll down to 'radio' section
 March 2006 DC Listeners Upset Over Switch To National Morning Radio Show

1939 establishments in Washington, D.C.
Howard University
Radio stations established in 1939
HUR-FM
Urban adult contemporary radio stations in the United States